The canton of Langres is an administrative division of the Haute-Marne department, northeastern France. Its borders were modified at the French canton reorganisation which came into effect in March 2015. Its seat is in Langres.

It consists of the following communes:
 
Beauchemin
Champigny-lès-Langres
Chanoy
Chatenay-Mâcheron
Chatenay-Vaudin
Faverolles
Humes-Jorquenay
Langres
Lecey
Marac
Mardor
Ormancey
Peigney
Perrancey-les-Vieux-Moulins
Saint-Ciergues
Saint-Martin-lès-Langres
Saint-Maurice
Saints-Geosmes

References

Cantons of Haute-Marne